Rabbi Akiva Grunblatt is an Orthodox rabbi who as co-rosh yeshiva (dean) heads the Yeshivas Rabbeinu Yisrael Meir HaKohen  (Yeshivas Chofetz Chaim) in Flushing, New York. (The other co-rosh yeshivas are Rabbi Dovid Harris and Rabbi Shaul Opoczynski) Before being appointed to his current position in 2000, he was a rosh yeshiva at Yeshiva Toras Chaim in Miami, Florida.

References 

American Orthodox rabbis
Living people
Year of birth missing (living people)
21st-century American Jews